Steven Hoffman (born 31 January 1994) is a South African professional soccer player who plays as a goalkeeper for Kosovan club Llapi.

Club career

Llapi
Hoffman had a trial at Football Superleague of Kosovo club Llapi in September 2020 and signed a one-year contract with the club for an undisclosed fee on 19 October 2020 and received squad number 36. Five days later, he made his debut for Llapi after being named in the starting line-up, and saved a penalty of Almir Kryeziu in a 2–0 home win against Arbëria.

References

External links

1994 births
Living people
Cape Coloureds
Sportspeople from Cape Town
South African soccer players
Association football goalkeepers
South African Premier Division players
Bidvest Wits F.C. players
Platinum Stars F.C. players
Vasco da Gama (South Africa) players
Football Superleague of Kosovo players
KF Llapi players